Tar Pit is a supervillain in the DC Comics universe and one of the new rogues of the current Flash (Wally West). The character was created by Geoff Johns. The character has been called a "Clayface knockoff".

Tar Pit made his live-action debut on the second season of the Arrowverse series The Flash, portrayed by Marco Grazzini. Josh Chambers portrayed the character in the ninth season.

Fictional character biography
The younger brother of a local drug lord Jack Monteleone, Joey Monteleone was arrested for armed robbery. While serving time, he discovered he had the metahuman ability to inhabit inanimate objects. With this ability, he got his kicks by transferring his mind from object (for example, a fire hydrant which he used to spray the Flash in vol. 2, #73) to object until he couldn't move his mind from, of course, a vat of asphalt. Now he remains in that hot tar pit while his real body remains unconscious and is being abused by his padded-cellmate in Iron Heights.

Now in his new form, Tar Pit first caused havoc at a Keystone City ice hockey game, trying to steal the Stanley Cup for himself. He was stopped by Flash and Captain Cold, although Cold himself stole the trophy. He has appeared sporadically with the other rogues ever since.

In Infinite Crisis, "Joey" became a member of the Secret Society of Super Villains.

Most recently, he has been seen among the new Injustice League and is one of the villains featured in Salvation Run.

In the Blackest Night crossover, Tar Pit is shown with Owen Mercer, visiting his father's grave, accompanying Owen in his search for the Black Lantern version of his father on the grounds that he will be of no interest to the Black Lantern Corps as his tar-based form has no heart for them to take.

In "The New 52", Tar Pit is shown about to attack Iris West following her defeating Folded Man when Flash appears. He thaws out the guards and sends the melted ice towards the villains.

During the "Forever Evil" storyline, Tar Pit is among the villains driven out of Central City by Gorilla Grodd at the time when the Crime Syndicate of America supposedly killed the Justice League. This led to Tar Pit joining up with the Secret Society of Super Villains as he is sent with Gorilla Grodd, Amazo, Archer, Black Bison, the Fearsome Five (Gizmo, Jinx, Mammoth, Psimon, Shimmer), Hyena, Multiplex, Parasite, Plastique, and Typhoon to deal with the rebellion of the Rogues. They were sucked into the Mirror World by Mirror Master.

When Girder initiated a prison break, Tar Pit temporarily breaks out to save Flash before he can be falsely imprisoned by Riddler.

When a Speed Force storm strikes Central City and turns its citizens into speedsters, Tar Pit is one of a few villains to not leave Central City.

On the night before Christmas, Tar Pit's nephew and niece were kidnapped by criminals. Tar Pit had to rob a toy store to pay their ransom only to be defeated by Kid Flash. As Tar Pit is taken to Iron Heights, Kid Flash rescued the children and defeated the criminals.

Powers and abilities
Tar Pit's body is made of molten asphalt and burns on touch. He is able to trap people in the substance of his body and can hurl flaming chunks of tar at his enemies. Due to his body being made of tar, Tar Pit is practically invulnerable.

Before becoming Tar Pit, Joey was able to project his consciousness into inanimate objects and animate them.

Other versions

Flashpoint
In the alternate timeline of the Flashpoint event, Tar Pit was imprisoned in Iron Heights. Tar Pit is confronted by Mirror Master, who assembles the Rogues. Tar Pit then escaped from Iron Heights and pursued revenge against Citizen Cold for stealing his family's money. Citizen Cold killed Tar Pit revealing that his brother Jack Monteleone was dealing drugs of their family fortune.

In other media
Tar Pit appears in The Flash, portrayed by Marco Grazzini in the second season and Josh Chambers in the ninth season. This version was pushed into a tar pit amidst the explosion of S.T.A.R. Labs' particle accelerator. After being freed by workers two years later, he gains the ability to transform into molten tar.

References

External links
 Tar Pit's bio

Comics characters introduced in 2001
DC Comics characters with superhuman strength
DC Comics metahumans
DC Comics supervillains
DC Comics characters who have mental powers
Characters created by Geoff Johns
Flash (comics) characters